Børre Steenslid (born 25 June 1985) is a Norwegian football coach and former player. He played as a defender for Sogndal, Viking and Molde. He is currently fitness coach at Molde.

Steenslid was called up to the Norwegian national team on 27 January 2009, as a part of caretaker coach Egil Olsen's first squad.

On 1 October 2013, it was announced that Steenslid had retired after failing to recover from a long-standing knee injury, and had now joined the coaching staff at Molde.

Career statistics
Source:

References

1985 births
Living people
People from Sogn og Fjordane
Norwegian footballers
Sogndal Fotball players
Viking FK players
Molde FK players
Eliteserien players
Norwegian First Division players
Molde FK non-playing staff
Association football defenders
Sportspeople from Vestland